Mięguszowiecki Summits are a group of three major summits in the main ridge of the Tatra Mountains on the border between Poland and Slovakia.

The highest one is the Mięguszowiecki Grand Peak (2,438m, second highest in Poland, fifteenth in Tatra Mountains). To the east of it there is  Mięguszowiecki Middle Peak (2393 m) and the Mięguszowiecki Black Peak (2410 m) further eastwards.

References

Tatra Mountains
Two-thousanders of Poland
Two-thousanders of Slovakia